Sackville Tufton, 8th Earl of Thanet (Lord Thanet) (1733–1786) was an English nobleman.

Life
He was the second son of Sackville Tufton, 7th Earl of Thanet. Tufton received his early education at Westminster School. He was hereditary High Sheriff of Westmorland from 1753 to 1786.

Family

Tufton married Mary, daughter of Lord John Sackville, in 1767. They had five sons and two daughters:

Elizabeth (died 1768)
Sackville Tufton, 9th Earl of Thanet
Charles Tufton, 10th Earl of Thanet
Caroline (born 1771), who married Joseph Foster Barham
John Tufton, a noted cricketer
Henry Tufton, 11th Earl of Thanet
Edward William (1777–1786), who died by drowning.

References

1733 births
1786 deaths
High Sheriffs of Westmorland
Earls of Thanet